Maggie Carlton (born July 24, 1957) is an American politician who served as a member of the Nevada Assembly. She represents District 14, which includes a portion of Las Vegas. Carlton previously served in the Nevada Senate, representing Clark County District 2 from 1998 to 2010.

Carlton previously served as a shop steward for the Culinary Workers Union at the Treasure Island Hotel and Casino.

References

External links
Nevada State Legislature - Senator Maggie Carlton official government website
Project Vote Smart - Senator Maggie Carlton (NV) profile
Follow the Money - Maggie Carlton
2006 2004 2002 1998 campaign contributions

1957 births
Living people
Democratic Party members of the Nevada Assembly
Democratic Party Nevada state senators
Politicians from St. Louis
Women state legislators in Nevada
2008 United States presidential electors
21st-century American politicians
21st-century American women politicians
20th-century American politicians
20th-century American women politicians